Bruce Lawrence Monks (November 8, 1923August 22, 2014) was a Michigan politician.

Early life and education
Monks was born on November 8, 1923 in Lansing, Michigan and graduated from Lansing Resurrection High School. In 1945, Monks earned an A.B. degree from Michigan State University. In 1952, Monks earned a J.D. degree from the Detroit College of Law.

Army career
From August 1945 to 1946, Monks served in the United States Army and became a corporal. While in the Army, he deployed overseas in March 1946 after World War II as a chief clerk and information assistant and served in the Philippines.

Career
Prior to serving in the Army, Monks worked for the United Press association as a teletype operator and reporter. He later became a lawyer. Monks was a member the State Bar of Michigan as well as the Macomb County Bar Association. From 1956 to 1959, Monks served as a justice of the peace in Clinton Township, Macomb County, Michigan. Monks served a supervisor of the same township from 1961 to 1965. On November 4, 1964, Monks was elected to the Michigan House of Representatives where he represented the 71st district from January 13, 1965 to December 31, 1966. On November 8, 1966, Monks was defeated in his attempt at re-election.

Personal life
Bruce lived in Mount Clemens, Michigan. Bruce was married twice. His first wife was Barbara, and his second wife was Estelle T. Ura. Estelle died on November 17, 2006. Bruce had five children. Bruce was Catholic, and was a member of the Knights of Columbus.

Death
Monks died on August 22, 2014. He was interred in Resurrection Cemetery in Clinton Township.

References

1923 births
2014 deaths
American expatriates in the Philippines
American justices of the peace
Burials in Michigan
Catholics from Michigan
Detroit College of Law alumni
Democratic Party members of the Michigan House of Representatives
Michigan lawyers
Michigan State University alumni
Military personnel from Michigan
People from Mount Clemens, Michigan
United States Army non-commissioned officers
20th-century American judges
20th-century American lawyers
20th-century American politicians